Anatoma munieri is a species of minute sea snail, a marine gastropod mollusk or micromollusk in the family Anatomidae.

Description
The size of the shell varies between 2 mm and 3 mm.
The shell has a turbiniform shape. The umbilicus is deep perspective. The elevated spire contains four, a little convex, whorls. These are sculptured with longitudinal, close, radiating lamellae, angular in the middle, and little, elevated, transverse lines. The base of the shell is ornamented with concentric elevated lirae.

This species is elevately turbinate, with two conspicuous carinate whorls and a deep perspective umbilicus. The fine lamellae of the upper part of the whorls are bent or angulated in the middle.

Distribution
This marine species occurs off the Philippines and Japan.

References

 Geiger D.L. (2012) Monograph of the little slit shells. Volume 1. Introduction, Scissurellidae. pp. 1-728. Volume 2. Anatomidae, Larocheidae, Depressizonidae, Sutilizonidae, Temnocinclidae. pp. 729–1291. Santa Barbara Museum of Natural History Monographs Number 7.

External links
 To Encyclopedia of Life
 To World Register of Marine Species
 

Anatomidae
Gastropods described in 1862